H line may refer to:
 H Line (RTD), a light rail line in Denver and Aurora, Colorado, U.S.
 H (Los Angeles Railway), former streetcar service
 Line H (Buenos Aires Underground), a metro line in Buenos Aires, Argentina
 The 404.7nm emission band from a Mercury-vapor lamp
 The calcium H line, an absorption line in the Sun's spectrum at 396.9nm
 Pencil skirt, sometimes called a H-line skirt

See also 
 H band (disambiguation)